Elfiyskaya Rukopis' (Эльфийская Рукопись, Elven Manuscript, 2004) is a metal opera and concept album by Russian power metal band Epidemia. Vocalists from Aria, Arida Vortex, Master, Chorny Obelisk and Boney NEM participated in the opera. The album was produced by Vladimir Holstinin (Aria's guitarist), who also played the lute at track 4.

Opera Scenario

The scenario of the opera is an epic fantasy story, written by Yuri Melisov, lead guitarist of Epidemia. Some parts of the story are influenced by Dragonlance and The Lord of the Rings.

Desmond the half-elf grew up in the elven kingdom of Enia, hidden from the whole world by a magic barrier, and learned the magic from the king's wizard, Irdis. He fell in love with the princess Alatiel and was exiled by the elven king. Desmond continued his studies in the magic school of the human lands, and participated in some adventurers' campaigns. There, he saved Thorwald the knight, who became his best friend.

At this time, Enia was attacked by the dark forces from the otherworld, led by Deimos. The otherworld, where Deimos ruled, was doomed because of its dying sun. Using the El-Gilet sphere, Deimos wished to teleport his whole army to Enia and conquer this new world. Deimos demanded Alatiel become his wife, which would let him be the legal king of the elven lands. He threatened that princess would otherwise be sacrificed in the sphere ritual, which required elven blood, but the brave maiden refused his offer.

Irdis the wizard was hurt while fighting the invaders but escaped through the portal to Desmond and asked him to save his homeland. Desmond agreed, hoping this deed would clear his name, and asked Thorwald to join him in his campaign. On their way, they met the inn's Tavern Master, who was instructed by Irdis and showed them the secret undermountain tunnel to Enia.

While walking through the tunnel, Desmond felt the presence of ancient magic and found the Scepter of The First Kings of Enia. They used this magic device to defeat the Dragon sent by Deimos. Followed by the remainder of elven knights, they stormed up into the king's palace, where Deimos was trying to complete the ritual. During the fight, Thorwald destroyed the sphere with the rod. Deimos escaped through the window and fled away on his dragon.

Desmond married Alatiel, though Irdis served as the regent and the real ruler until Desmond and Alatiel's children grew up, because the half-elf exile could not be crowned as the king.

Track list

All tracks by Yuri 'Juron' Melisov except tracks 3, 4 by Melisov/Pavel 'Bush' Bushuyev, track 5 by Melisov/Ilya Kniazev and track 9 by Roman Valeriev.

Track 12 is not a part of the opera but the bonus track on Elven Manuscript CD.

Starring

Desmond the half-elf – Max Samosvat (Epidemia)
Thorwald the knight – Andrey Lobashov (Arida Vortex)
Irdis the elven wizard – Arthur Berkut (Aria)
Deimos the dark lord – Dmitry Borisenkov (Chorny Obelisk)
Sky the blue dragon – Kirill Nemolayev (Boney NEM)
Alatiel the elven princess – Aleksandra Chebotareova
Tavern Master – Lexx (Master)

Sequels

Epidemia released Elven Manuscript 2: the Tale for All Times in 2007.

Epidemia's ex-drummer Andrey Laptev has tried to record his apocryphal sequel to the opera, entitled 'The Battle of Gods,' though he was not allowed to use the copyrighted name, logo and characters.

Epidemia released Treasure Of Enia in 2014 as sequel to Elven Manuscript 2: the Tale for All Times.

References

External links
Epidemia official website

Epidemia albums
Concept albums
Rock operas
2004 albums